Polish Extraleague may refer to:

Ekstraliga (speedway), the top division of motorcycle speedway in Poland
 Polish Basketball League or Dominet Bank Ekstraliga, the highest level league of professional basketball in Poland